The Surrey Park Football Club is an Australian rules football team that commenced in 1994. It is based in the eastern suburbs of Melbourne, Victoria, Australia and is part of the Eastern Football League.

Senior club history
The club is a merger of the Surrey Hills Football Club and the East Camberwell Football Club.

Surrey Hills FC
The Surrey Hills FC first appeared in 1887. It has played in the Reporter District Football League, the Victorian Amateur Football Association, the East Suburban Football League, the Croydon Ferntree Gully Football League and the Eastern Districts Football League. For a few years it served as the third open age team for Box Hill calling itself Box Hill/Surrey Hills.

East Camberwell FC
The East Camberwell FC was formed in 1946 and they played in the Catholic Youth Men's Society (CYMS) competition until 1963, when it moved to the YCW competition where it remained until 1972. In 1973 it transferred to the Eastern Suburbs Churches competition and joined the Southern Football League in 1993.

The merger
The merger of Surrey Hills and East Camberwell Football Club occurred in late 1994, and the newly formed club played its first season as Surrey Park Football Club in the SFL in 1995. The merged club adopted its name after the venue it plays its home games at.

The club has not won a senior premiership since the merger but it has won the reserve grade in 1996, 1999, 2000, 2004 and 2019.
 
The club transferred to the more geographically appropriate Eastern Football League in 2002. It holds the EFL record for the most losses in a row at 67.

Junior Affiliation
The club is affiliated with the Surrey Park Junior Football Club, who play in the Yarra Junior Football League. Many players from their junior team move into the senior team.

VFL/AFL players
 Colin Judd (Hawthorn) Also played for Camberwell in the VFA
 Phillip Murton (Hawthorn)
 Warwick Irwin Played 229 VFL games with Fitzroy and  Collingwood

References

Australian rules football clubs in Melbourne
Australian rules football clubs established in 1994
Eastern Football League (Australia) clubs
1994 establishments in Australia
Sport in the City of Whitehorse